Jan Wojnowski (23 December 1946 in Torzewo - 9 February 1990 in Bydgoszcz) was a Polish weightlifter. Among his achievements was a fourth place at the 1968 Summer Olympics, and a bronze medal at the 1973 World Championships.

References

External links

1946 births
1990 deaths
Polish male weightlifters
Olympic weightlifters of Poland
Weightlifters at the 1968 Summer Olympics
Weightlifters at the 1972 Summer Olympics
People from Radziejów County
Sportspeople from Kuyavian-Pomeranian Voivodeship
20th-century Polish people